John B. Buse formerly held the position of President, Medicine & Science on the board of the American Diabetes Association during 2008. Buse currently serves as the Director of the Diabetes Care Center at UNC.

Biography 
Buse attended high school at Porter-Gaud School School in Charleston, South Carolina, SC. He went on to receive his bachelor's degree in biochemistry from Dartmouth College and his Medical and Doctoral degrees from Duke University. He completed his internship and residency in internal medicine and his fellowship in endocrinology at the University of Chicago.  He is the brother of Paul Buse, MD.

References

Year of birth missing (living people)
Living people